The common bottlenose dolphin or Atlantic bottlenose dolphin (Tursiops truncatus) is a wide-ranging marine mammal of the family Delphinidae. The common bottlenose dolphin is a very familiar dolphin due to the wide exposure it gets in captivity in marine parks and dolphinariums, and in movies and television programs. It is the largest species of the beaked dolphins. It inhabits temperate and tropical oceans throughout the world, and is absent only from polar waters. While formerly known simply as the bottlenose dolphin, this term is now applied to the genus Tursiops as a whole. As considerable genetic variation has been described within this species, even between neighboring populations, many experts think additional species may be recognized.

Taxonomy 
Until 1998, all bottlenose dolphins were considered one species T. truncatus. That year, the Indo-Pacific bottlenose dolphin (T. aduncus) was recognized as a separate species. The two species are thought to have split during the mid-Pleistocene, about 1 million years ago.

Currently, three common bottlenose dolphin subspecies are recognized:
T. t. truncatus, the nominate subspecies
T. t. ponticus, or the Black Sea bottlenose dolphin
T. t. gephyreus, or Lahille’s bottlenose dolphin

Bottlenose dolphins along the southern California and Baja California coasts were previously recognized as the Pacific bottlenose dolphin, T. t. gillii. The name has since been reclassified as a junior synonym of Tursiops truncatus.

A 2020 study identified four distinct lineages within T. truncatus, each of which could be a distinct subspecies: a lineage native to the coastal regions of the western North Atlantic (off the coast of North America), an offshore lineage found worldwide in pelagic ecosystems, a lineage native to the Mediterranean, and a lineage restricted to the Black Sea (previously described as T. truncatus ponticus). The study noted only weak differentiation between the Black Sea and Mediterranean lineages, and found them to form a sister group to the offshore lineage, indicating that they likely descended from offshore bottlenoses that colonized the Mediterranean and Black Seas. The clade containing the offshore, Mediterranean, and Black Sea populations was sister to the western North Atlantic lineage, indicating deep divergence between the two.

Description
Males are generally larger and heavier than females. Dolphins have a short and well-defined snout that looks like an old-fashioned gin bottle, which is the source for their common name.

Like all whales and dolphins, though, the snout is not a true nose; the nose instead evolved into the blowhole on the top of their heads. Their necks are more flexible than other dolphins' due to five of their seven vertebrae not being fused together like in other dolphins.

Intelligence

The common bottlenose dolphin has a larger brain than humans. Many investigations of bottlenose intelligence include tests of mimicry, use of artificial language, object categorization, and self-recognition. This intelligence has driven considerable interaction with humans. The common bottlenose dolphin is popular in aquarium shows and television programs such as Flipper. It has also been trained for military uses such as locating sea mines or detecting and marking enemy divers, as for example in the U.S. Navy Marine Mammal Program. In some areas, they cooperate with local fishermen by driving fish toward the fishermen and eating the fish that escape the fishermen's nets.

Ecology and behavior

As a very social species, the common bottlenose dolphin lives in groups called pods that typically number about 15 individuals, but group size varies from pairs of dolphins to over 100 or even occasionally over 1,000 animals for short periods of time. The types of groups include: nursery groups, juvenile groups, and groups of adult males.

Diet
Its diet consists mainly of eels, squid, shrimp and a wide variety of fishes. It does not chew its food, instead swallowing it whole. Dolphin pods often work as a team to harvest schools of fish, though they also hunt individually. Dolphins search for prey primarily using echolocation, which is a form of sonar.

The diet of common bottlenose dolphin pods varies depending on area. Along the U.S. Atlantic coast, the main prey includes Atlantic croakers (Micropogonias undulatus), spot (Leiostomus xanthurus) and American silver perch (Bairdiella chrysoura), while in South Africa, African massbankers (Trachurus delagoa), olive grunters (Pomadasys olivaceus), and pandora (Pagellus bellottii) are common bottlenose dolphin's typical prey.

According to combined stomach content and stable isotope analyses in the Gulf of Cádiz, although European conger (Conger conger) and European hake (Merluccius merluccius) are most important prey of common bottlenose dolphins, mass-balance isotopic mixing model (MixSIAR), using δ13C and δ15N showns that Sparidae species; seabreams (Diplodus annularis and D. bellottii), rubberlip grunt (Plectorhinchus mediterraneus), and common pandora, (Pagellus erythrinus)) and a mixture of other species including European hake, mackerels (Scomber colias, S. japonicus and S. scombrus), European conger, red bandfish (Cepola macrophthalma) and European pilchard (Sardina pilchardus) are the assimilated diet.

Research indicates that the type and range of fish in a dolphin's diet can have a significant impact on its health and metabolism.

Communication
Dolphins also use sound for communication, including squeaks emitted from the blowhole, whistles emitted from nasal sacs below the blowhole, and sounds emitted through body language, such as leaping from the water and slapping their tails on the water. The dolphins address each other individually through matched whistling, where individuals respond to whistles of other dolphins by using the same whistle.

Their heads contain an oily substance that both acts as an acoustic lens and protects the brain case. They emit clicking sounds and listen for the return echoes to determine the location and shape of nearby items, including potential prey.

Reproduction

Mating behavior of bottlenose dolphin is polygamous. Although they can breed throughout the year, it mostly occurs in spring. Males form alliances to seek an estrous female. For a chance to mate with the female, males separate the female from her home range. Females bear a calf every three to six years. After a year-long gestation period, females bear a single calf. They can live as long as 40–50 years. The calf's suckling lasts between 18 and 20 months and they are weaned between three and eight years of age. Sexual maturity varies by population, and ranges from 5–14 years of age; sexual maturity occurs between 8 and 13 years for males and 5 to 10 years for females.

Life expectancy
The average life expectancy of common bottlenose dolphins is about 17 years old, but in captivity they have been known to live to up to 51 years old.

Distribution
The common bottlenose dolphin can be found in temperate, subtropical, and tropical oceans around the world. The global population has been estimated at 600,000. Some bottlenose populations live closer to the shore (inshore populations) and others live further out to sea (offshore populations). Generally, offshore populations are larger, darker, and have proportionally shorter fins and beaks. However, some inshore populations make long migrations in response to El Niño events. The species has occurred as far as 50° north in eastern Pacific waters, possibly as a result of warm water events. The coastal dolphins appear to adapt to warm, shallow waters. It has a smaller body and larger flippers, for maneuverability and heat dispersal. They can be found in harbors, bays, lagoons and estuaries. Offshore dolphins, however, are adapted to cooler, deeper waters. Certain qualities in their blood suggest they are more suited to deep diving. Their considerably larger body protects them against predators and helps them retain heat.

Other human interactions

Some interactions with humans are harmful to the dolphins. Dolphin hunting industry exists in multiple countries including Japan, where common bottlenose dolphins are hunted for food annually in the town of Taiji, and the Faroe Islands. Also, dolphins are sometimes killed inadvertently as a bycatch of tuna fishing.

Tião was a well-known solitary male bottlenose dolphin that was first spotted in the town of São Sebastião in Brazil around 1994 and frequently allowed humans to interact with him. The dolphin later became infamous for killing a swimmer and injuring many others, which earned it the nickname of killer dolphin.

Fungie is another solitary male bottlenose, living in close contact with humans in Dingle Harbour, Ireland, since 1983. He has become a symbol of the town, although some doubt exists over whether he is a single dolphin.

Conservation
The North Sea, Baltic, Mediterranean and Black Sea populations of the common bottlenose dolphin are listed in Appendix II to the Convention on the Conservation of Migratory Species of Wild Animals (CMS) of the Bonn Convention, since they have an unfavorable conservation status or would benefit significantly from international cooperation organized by tailored agreements.

The species is included in Appendix II of the Convention on International Trade in Endangered Species (CITES), meaning international trade (including in parts/derivatives) is regulated.

Estimated population of a few specific areas are including: 

The species is covered by the Agreement on Small Cetaceans of the Baltic, North East Atlantic, Irish and North Seas (ASCOBANS), the Agreement on the Conservation of Cetaceans in the Black Sea, Mediterranean Sea and Contiguous Atlantic Area (ACCOBAMS), the Memorandum of Understanding for the Conservation of Cetaceans and Their Habitats in the Pacific Islands Region, and the Memorandum of Understanding Concerning the Conservation of the Manatee and Small Cetaceans of Western Africa and Macaronesia.

Marine pollution 

Common bottlenose dolphins are the most common apex predators found in coastal and estuarine ecosystems along the southern coast of the US, thus serve as an important indicator species of bioaccumulation and health of the ecosystem.

It is believed that some diseases commonly found in dolphins are related to human behaviors, such as water pollution. Water pollution is linked to point and non-point source pollution. Point source pollution comes from a single source such as an oil spill and/or chemical discharge from a specific facility. The environmental impact of the Deepwater Horizon oil spill caused a direct impact and still serves as a long-term impact of future populations. Common bottlenose dolphins use these important habitats for calving, foraging, and feeding. Environmental impacts or changes from chemicals or marine pollution can alter and disrupt endocrine systems, affecting future populations. For example, oil spills have been related to lung and reproductive diseases in female dolphins. A recent studysuggested signs of lung disease and impaired stress in 32 dolphins that were captured and assessed in Barataria Bay, Louisiana, US. Out of these 32 dolphins, 10 were found pregnant and, upon a 47-month check up, only 20% produced feasible calves, compared to a previous success rate of 83%, in the same area. It is believed that a recent oil spill in this area is partially to blame for these severely low numbers.

Dense human development along the eastern coast of Florida and intense agricultural activity have resulted in increased freshwater inputs, changes in drainage patterns, and altered water quality (i.e. chemical contamination, high nutrient input, decreased salinity, decreased sea grass habitat, and eutrophication. High nutrient input from agriculture chemicals and fertilizers causes eutrophication and hypoxia, causing a severe reduction in water quality. Excess of phosphorus and nitrogen from these non-point sources deplete the natural cycle of oxygen by overconsumption of algae. Harmful algal blooms are responsible for dead zones and unusual mortality events of common bottlenose dolphins consuming these toxic fish from the brevetoxin produced by the dinoflagellate Karenia brevis. Brevetoxins are neurotoxins that can cause acute respiratory and neurological symptoms, including death, in marine mammals, sea turtles, birds, and fishes.

See also

List of cetaceans
Unihemispheric slow-wave sleep

References

External links 

 View the dolphin genome on Ensembl
 
 

common bottlenose dolphin
Tool-using mammals
Cosmopolitan mammals
Pantropical fauna
common bottlenose dolphin
Symbols of Mississippi